The Sweet Blue Flowers Japanese anime television series is based on the manga series of the same name written and illustrated by Takako Shimura. The episodes, produced by J.C.Staff, are directed by Kenichi Kasai, written by Fumihiko Takayama, and features character design by Masayuki Onchi who based the designs on Shimura's original concept.　Many of the episode titles are novel titles as well. For example, Hana Monogatari is a novel by Nobuko Yoshiya, while Haru no Arashi (Gertrud) and Seishun wa Uruwashi (Schön ist die Jugend) are novels by Hermann Hesse.

The story focuses on Fumi Manjōme, a lesbian high school girl, and her close childhood friend Akira Okudaira who tries to keep her friends happy through difficult times. Eleven episodes were produced which aired in Japan between July 2 and September 10, 2009 on Fuji TV as the third series in Fuji TV's Noise timeslot. Five DVD compilation volumes were released by Media Factory between October 23, 2009 and February 25, 2010. Two pieces of theme music are used for the episodes; one opening theme and one ending theme.

Episode list

See also

List of Sweet Blue Flowers chapters

References

External links
Anime official website 

Sweet Blue Flowers